Cevizli is a village in the Çukurca District in Hakkâri Province in Turkey. The village is populated by Kurds of the Pinyanişî tribe and had a population of 36 in 2022.

The four hamlets of Başak, Güven, Sütlü and Yaylak are attached to Cevizli. Güven and Sütlü are unpopulated.

Population 
Population history of the village from 2007 to 2022:

References 

Kurdish settlements in Hakkâri Province
Villages in Çukurca District